Laninamivir (CS-8958) is a neuraminidase inhibitor that is a drug used for the treatment and prophylaxis of Influenzavirus A and Influenzavirus B. It is currently in Phase III clinical trials. It is a long-acting neuraminidase inhibitor administered by nasal inhalation.

Laninamivir was approved for influenza treatment in Japan in 2010 and for prophylaxis in 2013. It is currently marketed under the name Inavir by Daiichi Sankyo. Biota Pharmaceuticals  and Daiichi Sankyo co-own Laninamivir. On 1 April 2011, BARDA awarded up to an estimated U$231m to Biota Pharmaceuticals  (Formerly Biota Holdings Ltd) wholly owned subsidiary, Biota Scientific Management Pty Ltd, for the advanced development of Laninamivir in the US. It is under clinical evaluations in other countries.

References

Guanidines
Neuraminidase inhibitors
Dihydropyrans
Acetamides